Austrocylindropuntia cylindrica (syn. Opuntia cylindrica), the cane cactus, is a species of flowering plant in the family Cactaceae. It is native to Colombia, Ecuador, and Peru, and it has been introduced to the Canary Islands, Morocco, Eritrea, Ethiopia, South Africa, Australia, and New Zealand. A popular ornamental, it is an invasive species in Europe, South Africa, and Australia. Due to a misidentification, for a time this species was erroneously thought to contain mescaline.

References

Opuntioideae
Ornamental plants
Flora of Colombia
Flora of Ecuador
Flora of Peru
Plants described in 1942